Pingleshwar railway station is a railway station of Ujjain, Madhya Pradesh. It is operated by Western Railway Zone which lies on Ujjain-Bhopal track. The station consist of two platforms. The platforms are not well sheltered. It lacks many facilities including water and sanitation.

Connectivity 

 Bhopal Ratlam Passenger
 Dahod Habibganj Fast Passenger
 Bina Ratlam via Nagda Passenger
 Nagda Bina Passenger

References

Railway stations in Ujjain district
Ratlam railway division
Buildings and structures in Ujjain
Transport in Ujjain
Railway stations in Ujjain
Year of establishment missing